Aghazadeh is a colloquialism in Iran and the Kurdistan region to describe the children of elite people.

Aghazadeh may also refer to:

Locations 
 Aqazadeh, Esfarayen County, North Khorasan Province, Iran.
 Kalateh-ye Aqazadeh, Sabzevar County, Razavi Khorasan Province, Iran
 Aghazadeh Mansion, a mansion located in Abarkooh, Iran

Other
 Aghazadeh (TV series), an Iranian TV series
 Gholam Reza Aghazadeh, Iranian politician